V. Mohan is an Indian diabetologist. He is the Chairman and Chief of Diabetology at Dr. Mohan’s Diabetes Specialities Centre, which is  an IDF Centre of Excellence in Diabetes Care. He is also the President and Director of the Madras Diabetes Research Foundation in Chennai which is an ICMR Center for Advanced Research on Diabetes.

Summary
Dr. Mohan has been delivering care to patients with diabetes across the country via its centres and tele-medicine. He has trained thousands of diabetologists in India and other developing countries. He also has contributed to scientific research on diabetes and serves on various national and international bodies in his field of specialisation. He is ranked amongst the top 2% of scientists in the world and the top scientist in India in the field of Endocrinology & Metabolism as per Stanford University Global Ranking. and among top 0.1% of researchers in type 2 Diabetes by Expertscape (Pubmed)

Education
Mohan completed his undergraduate (MBBS) and postgraduate medical education (MD, General Medicine) from Madras Medical College, Chennai, India. He then worked for a year as a Welcome Trust Research Fellow at the Royal Postgraduate Medical School and Hammersmith Hospital, London, U.K and later for a year as an Alexander Von Humboldt Fellow at the University of Ulm, West Germany. He was awarded a PhD and later a Doctor of Science (D.Sc.) by thesis for his research on diabetes.

Mohan’s activities cover a wide range of clinical services, training and education, rural diabetes services and charity, research and public education and activities on diabetes.

Clinical services
Mohan started working on diabetes as an undergraduate medical student when he joined his father, the pioneer in Diabetology Prof M. Viswanathan. Together with his father, he set up the first private diabetes centre in India in 1971 and continued to work at this centre till 1991. Mohan and his late wife Rema Mohan subsequently established their own diabetes centres under the name of "Dr. Mohan’s Diabetes Specialities Centre". He and his colleagues currently oversees a chain of 50 diabetes centres across 8 states of India and have over 560,000 registered diabetes patients at these centres.

Training and education programs in diabetes
Mohan has started several training courses for diabetes. This includes a two-year Fellowship in Diabetology for medical doctors with an undergraduate degree and a one-year Post Doctoral Fellowship in Diabetology for those with a post-graduate degree in Internal Medicine. In collaboration with the Public Health Foundation of India (PHFI), Dr. Mohan’s Diabetes Education Academy (DMDEA) has started a Certificate Course in Evidence-Based Management of Diabetes. In association with Indian Diabetes Educators Association, DMDEA also started a Certificate Course in Diabetes Education. As part of MDRF, he curated the MDRF- UAB Fogarty Grant which ran for over five years.

Rural diabetes services and charity
Mohan established a rural diabetology service with a fully equipped mobile diabetes van and satellite connection with the initial support of the World Diabetes Foundation (WDF), Denmark, and the Indian Space Research Organization (ISRO) and the National Agro Foundation (NAF). He and his colleagues screened a population of over 50,000 people in 42 villages near Chunampet in Tamil Nadu in south India and provided free diabetes treatment to hundreds of patients through this service. He also provides free treatment to a large number of diabetic patients along with the Sri Sathya Sai Organization, Tamil Nadu through 3 free diabetic clinics. Mohan is a follower of Sathya Sai Baba and a member of Sri Sathya Sai Central Trust.

Research
In 1996, Mohan established the Madras Diabetes Research Foundation (MDRF) in Asia. His research combines clinical, epidemiological, and genomic aspects of diabetes. He has published over 1500 papers including over 1000 original research articles in peer-reviewed journals, 360 invited reviews and editorials and 190 chapters in text-books on Diabetes and Internal Medicine published in India and abroad. His research work has an h-index of 140, an i 10 index of 890 and has attracted over 159,000 citations. His areas of work include Epidemiology of diabetes and its complications, Genomics of diabetes, Nutrition and Diabetes and Fibrocalculous Pancreatic Diabetes.[6].

Awards
Mohan has received several awards, including the Padma Shri National Award by the Government of India for his accomplishments in the field of diabetology. In 2018, he received the Harold Rifkin Distinguished International Service in the Cause of Diabetes Award" from the American Diabetes Association. He is also a recipient of the Dr. B. C. Roy Award of the Medical Council of India.

He was recognized as the Top Scientist from Tamil Nadu State in India.

Publications 
 
'Making Excellence a Habit: The Secret to Building a World-Class Healthcare System in India’, published by Penguin India in February 2021.
 Banting, Best and Beyond Published by Notion Press in May 2022. Available on Amazon India

References

External links
 
 
 Top 2% scientists in the world. 14 November 2020.

Recipients of the Padma Shri in medicine
Indian diabetologists
Living people
20th-century Indian biologists
Scientists from Chennai
Dr. B. C. Roy Award winners
Year of birth missing (living people)